The Carlos Palanca Memorial Awards for Literature winners in the year 1952 (rank, title of winning entry, name of author).


English division

Short story
First prize: "The Virgin" by Kerima Polotan
Second prize: "Children of the Ash-covered Loam" by N.V.M. Gonzales
Third prize: "Even Purple Hearts" by Bienvenido N. Santos

Filipino (Tagalog) division

Short story in Filipino
First prize: "Kahiwagaan" by Pablo N. Bautista
Second prize: "Kamatayan sa Gulod" by M.J. Ocampo
Third prize: "Pagbabalik" by Genoveva Edroza Matute

References
 

Palanca Awards
1952 literary awards